Fast5 (originally called Fastnet) is a variation of netball featuring shortened games and goals worth multiple points. The new format was announced by the International Federation of Netball Associations (IFNA) (now the International Netball Federation) in 2008, and was primarily developed for a new international competition, the Fast5 Netball World Series. The rules were revamped for 2012, with the variation being renamed Fast5.

Background 
In 2008, the IFNA released the details of a new, faster format of netball, which eventually became known as "fastnet". The new format was developed for a new international netball competition, the World Netball Series. According to the IFNA, the new rules were ultimately designed to make games faster and more television-friendly, with the ultimate aim of raising the sport's profile and attracting more spectators and greater sponsorship. Previously, the new rules had been trialled by England junior and senior netball squads over a 12-month period. Some of the new rules were announced in December 2008, including six-minute playing quarters and power plays; others were announced in February 2009. The new format was quickly compared to Twenty20 cricket and rugby sevens.

Playing rules 
Fast5 features modified rules that are outlined below. Outside of these, the standard rules of netball apply (see Netball rules).
 Players: Each side only has five players on the court, compared with seven in normal netball competition.
 Timing: Each quarter lasts only six minutes, compared with 15 minutes in normal international netball competition. Breaks in between quarters are two minutes each. Injury time-outs are 30 seconds only; standard rules allow for one initial two-minute injury time-out.
 Coaching: Coaches can give instructions to players from the sidelines during play, from in front of their playing bench. Standard international rules do not allow coaching during play.
 Substitutions: Teams are allowed to use rolling substitutions, with no stoppages in play per substitution and with unlimited substitutions per quarter. Standard international rules only allow substitutions either between quarters or when a player is injured.
 Power plays: Each team can separately nominate one "power play" quarter, in which each goal scored by that team counts for double points. This is somewhat similar to power plays in One Day International and Twenty20 cricket, although it is not a feature of standard netball. The two teams cannot nominate the same quarter to be their power play.
 Two and Three-point shots: Similar to three-point field goals in basketball and two-point goals in six-a-side indoor netball, the goal shooter (GS) and goal attack (GA) may shoot goals from anywhere in the goal third. These goals count for two points if shot from between the inner and outer goal circles and three points if shot from outside the outer goal circle; in a power-play quarter, they would count for four and six points respectively. In standard netball rules, goals can only be shot from within a single goal circle and count for one point only.
 Centre passes: After each goal, the team that conceded the goal takes the next centre pass; teams alternate taking the first centre pass of each quarter. Under normal rules, a coin toss determines the first centre pass of the match, after which centre passes alternate between the two teams.
 Tied scores: Tied games are decided by a period of extra time lasting 1 minute. If the scores are still tied at the end of that time, play continues until the next goal is scored.

Competitions
The main Fast5 competition is the Fast5 Netball World Series; presently, it is the only international competition based on the new format. It was first held in October 2009 and is contested on an annual basis between the top six national netball teams in the IFNA World Rankings. Regional fastnet competitions also emerged in 2009 in England. The Jamaica Netball Association announced plans for a domestic fastnet competition in their country starting in 2010. In the United Kingdom, the British Fast5 Netball All-Stars Championship was launched in 2017 and is fought by each of the teams that participate in the Netball Superleague, the elite domestic netball competition in the UK.

References

External links
 

Netball variants